General Electric Research Laboratory was the first industrial research facility in the United States. Established in 1900, the lab was home to the early technological breakthroughs of General Electric and created a research and development environment that set the standard for industrial innovation for years to come. It developed into GE Global Research that now covers an array of technological research, ranging from healthcare to transportation systems, at multiple locations throughout the world. Its campus in Schenectady, New York was designated a National Historic Landmark in 1975.

History

Founding 
Founded in 1900 by Thomas Edison, Willis R. Whitney, and Charles Steinmetz, this lab defined industrial research for years to come.  Elihu Thomson, one of the founding members of the laboratory, summed up the goal of the lab saying, "It does seem to me therefore that a Company as large as the General Electric Company, should not fail to continue investing and developing in new fields: there should, in fact, be a research laboratory for commercial applications of new principles, and even for the discovery of those principles." Furthermore, Edwin W. Rice, founding vice president, said they wanted to "establish a laboratory to be devoted exclusively to original research.  It is hoped by this means that many profitable fields may be discovered."  Whitney and the founders of the research lab took many of their lab ideals from a German university model.  German universities allowed professors to research and experiment with their own interests to seek further knowledge without having commercial or economic interests in mind.  Other German scientists also researched exclusively with business in mind.   But, these two views contributed to a successful relationship between science and industry.  It was this success that influenced Whitney in his vision for the GE Research Lab.

The laboratory began at a time when the American electrification process was in its infant stage.  General Electric became the leader of this move toward electrifying the United States and developing new technologies for many other science and technology fields.  Willis Whitney and his assistant, Thomas Dempster, were the key researchers in developing the electrical technology that allowed the laboratory to continue to grow. The lab grew from 8 people to 102 people by 1906, which included scientifically trained researchers that made up 40% of the staff.  Whitney believed in exploratory scientific research, with the goal of creating new commercial products.  These two goals appealed to General Electric. For researchers, the lab provided time and money for experimentation, research, and personal interests without putting a high demand on developing theories or teaching. Nearly 30 years after its founding, the laboratory had expanded the staff to more than 400 chemists, physicists, and electrical engineers, plus their assistants.

Early success
It took several years for the lab to follow through with the vision to create all original innovations, instead of improving on the inventions already in place.  GE's earliest project was perfecting the incandescent light bulb.  In 1908, engineer and new head researcher William Coolidge invented the ductile tungsten light bulb filament, providing a more durable and long-lasting light filament than the existing technology. "The invention secured GE's technological leadership in the market and epitomized the role of the GE research lab — bringing innovation to the marketplace."  But, that work was still an improvement on existing technology and nothing entirely new.  In the coming years, GE scientists earned two Nobel Prizes in chemistry and physics.  In 1932, Irving Langmuir won the Nobel Prize in chemistry for his work on surface chemical reactions which helped him develop the gas-filled light bulb in 1916.  After patenting many inventions, Langmuir developed his new light bulb which reinvented lights altogether.  By 1928, due to Langmuir's innovation, GE held 96% of incandescent light sales in America.  That entirely new invention set GE on a path to follow through with Whitney and Rice's vision for the lab.

Later history
Starting with the success of the incandescent and gas-filled light bulbs, General Electric expanded its research to a range of technological and scientific fields.  It strove for commercial goals in any innovation they achieved. Throughout its history, the General Electric Research Laboratory has earned thousands of patents for innovative technology, redefining industries and commercial products.

In 1999, the laboratory became GE Global Research after opening a research center in Bangalore, India. GE later opened research laboratories in Oklahoma, China, Germany, and Brazil, but closed all but the New York and India locations in 2017 as part of cost cutting measures. GE has expanded its research beyond lighting to appliances, aviation, electrical distribution, energy, healthcare, media & entertainment, oil & gas, transportation, and water, along with numerous other fields. They employ 3,000 employees and continue to bring innovation and technology to the world, the same goal of General Electric that was first proposed by Whitney and Steinmetz.

Notable historic innovations
 1900: GE Industrial Research Laboratory is established
 1902: Electric fan
 1908: Tungsten light bulb filament
 1910: First electric hotpoint range
 1916: Gas-filled light bulb
 1918: Record-capacity water wheel generator at Niagara Falls
 1918: Trans-oceanic radio system
 1920: Portable x-ray machine
 1921: GE turbosupercharger engine helps an aircraft reach a record altitude
 1921: Magnetron vacuum tube
 1927: First television brought into the home
 1941: First U.S. Jet Engine
 1943: First auto-pilot system
 1946: Cloud seeding developed
 1949: The J47 jet engine is developed, which came to be the most produced gas turbine jet engine in history 
 1962: Solid-state laser
 1969: Key technologies in the first moon landing
 1976: Computed Tomography (CT) scanner
 1983: Signa Magnetic Resonance Imaging system (MRI)
 2002: Popularization of wind turbines
 2003: Fuel-efficient Evolution Series locomotive engine
 2007: First 24 cylinder internal combustion engine

Notable employees
Ralph Alpher, cosmologist
LeRoy Apker, solid-state physicist
George C. Baldwin, theoretical and experimental physicist 
Frank Benford, electrical engineer and physicist best known for rediscovering and generalizing Benford's law
Charles Coffin, businessman and engineer
William David Coolidge, physicist
Thomas Edison, inventor, scientist and businessman
Ivar Giaever, Nobel Laureate and physicist
Robert N. Hall, physicist, inventor of the first laser diode
Nick Holonyak, physicist, inventor of the first visible light laser diode
Peter T. Kirstein, computer scientist
Irving Langmuir, Nobel Laureate, chemist and physicist
David Musser, computer scientist
Charles Proteus Steinmetz, mathematician and electrical engineer
Alexander Stepanov, computer scientist
Elihu Thomson, engineer and inventor
Willis Rodney Whitney, chemist

See also 
 Bell Labs
 DuPont
 Industrial laboratory
 Knolls Atomic Power Laboratory
 List of National Historic Landmarks in New York
 Menlo Park, New Jersey
 National Register of Historic Places listings in Schenectady County, New York
 Westinghouse Electric (1886)

References 

National Historic Landmarks in New York (state)
General Electric
Buildings and structures in Schenectady, New York
Research institutes established in 1900
1900 establishments in New York (state)
Thomas Edison
National Register of Historic Places in Schenectady County, New York